Glyder may refer to the Glyderau, a range of mountains (some with the name Glyder) in north Wales. The name can also refer to:

Places
 Glyder (electoral ward), in Bangor, Wales

Miscellaneous
 Glyder (band), a hard rock music group from Ireland
 Glyder 2, a 2009 video game
 Glyder, a puppy with large ears, introduced in the second series of TV animation The Puppy's Further Adventures